The Tibareni (Tibarenebi; Greek: Τιβαρηνοί and Τιβαρανοί;) were a people residing on the coast of ancient Pontus referred to in Herodotus, Xenophon, Strabo and other classical authors. The Tibareni were believed to be of proto-Kartvelian or Scythian origin.

History 

Tibareni occupied the country between the Chalybes and the Mosynoeci, on the east of the river Isis, and the country was called Tibarenia.
They are mentioned as early as the time of Herodotus, According to the ancient Greeks, the Tibareni were Scythians. Strabo describes them as inhabiting the mountains branching off from the Montes Moschici and Colchici, and mentions Cotyura as their principal town. They appear to have been a harmless and happy people, who performed all their duties in a joyous manner. Their arms consisted of wooden helmets, small shields, and short spears with long points. Xenophon and his Greeks spent three days in travelling through their country.

All three tribes — Tibareni,  Chalybes and Mosynoeci — still neighbored each other, along the Black Sea coast of Anatolia (ancient Pontus), as late as in Roman times. Tibareni, along with the other Proto-Georgian tribes were subjugated by the Achaemenid Empire in the 6th-5th centuries BC and were incorporated into the XIX Satrapy.

References

See also
Chalybes
Mossynoeci
Moschi
Macrones

History of Pontus
Tribes in Greco-Roman historiography
Ancient peoples of Anatolia